The Deseret Management Corporation (DMC) is a global operating company, managing for-profit entities affiliated with the Church of Jesus Christ of Latter-day Saints (LDS Church). It was established in 1966 by church president David O. McKay to hold already-existing church assets. DMC companies provide content, services, and information through a diverse portfolio of companies, with the majority being media and communications brands.

Subsidiaries
The following are DMC subsidiaries:

Beneficial Financial Group: insurance, investment, and retirement services.
Bonneville International Corporation: owns radio stations nationwide, Bonneville Interactive, and Bonneville Satellite Company.
Bonneville Communications (Boncom): Advertising agency.
Deseret Book: LDS publisher and bookstores chain.
Deseret Mutual: Provides medical, dental, life, and disability insurance, retirement and savings benefits to DMC employees, and health insurance to LDS Church missionaries and General Authorities.
Deseret News Publishing Company: Publishes Utah's second-largest daily newspaper, the Deseret News, along with the Church News and El Observador. 
Hawaii Reserves: manages commercial and residential properties in Lā'ie, Hawai'i.
Temple Square Hospitality: operates downtown Salt Lake City properties such as the Lion House and the Joseph Smith Memorial Building.
Utah Property Management Associates: Real estate company which manages apartments and commercial property, particularly in downtown Salt Lake City.

Divisions
Deseret Digital Media: Operates the web sites of other DMC media companies, including deseretnews.com and ksl.com.
Deseret Media Companies: Helps operate Deseret Management's media focused subsidiaries.
KSL Broadcast Division: Operates KSL-TV & KSL Newsradio in Salt Lake City, Utah, for the Bonneville International Corporation.

Leadership
In April 2012, Keith B. McMullin was named as CEO, replacing Mark Willes.

In October 2021, DMC hired Aaron Sherinian to a new role of senior vice president of global reach.

Relation to LDS Church
DMC is the holding company which owns the tax-paying companies that fall under the umbrella of the LDS Church.  DMC's Board of Directors is made up of the church's First Presidency, three rotating members of the Quorum of the Twelve, and the Presiding Bishopric.

See also
 Finances of The Church of Jesus Christ of Latter-day Saints
 Intellectual Reserve

References

 
Companies based in Salt Lake City
Financial services companies established in 1966
Properties of the Church of Jesus Christ of Latter-day Saints
1966 establishments in Utah